Set List is a greatest hits album by Canadian country music artist Duane Steele. It was released by Jolt/Royalty Records on June 1, 2004. Singles released from the album include "Better Man," "Nobody Cheated, Nobody Lied" and "Sad Country Song."

Track listing
"Nobody Cheated, Nobody Lied" – 3:05
"Sad Country Song" – 3:52
"Better Man" – 4:10
"The Heart of the It Don't Matter" – 3:09
"I-65" – 3:43
"This Is Love" – 3:02
"The Goodside of Your Goodbye" – 3:20
"I'll Be Alright" – 4:10
"Make Me Crazy" – 2:47
"Right from the Start" – 3:24
"If I Could Just Get to You" – 2:50
"If You Could Read My Mind" – 4:01
"Little Black Dress" – 3:21
"Leavin' Made Easy" – 3:35
"Tell the Girl" – 2:34
"She's Tough" – 3:33
"Two Names on an Overpass" – 3:29
duet with Lisa Brokop
"The Trouble with Love" – 3:37
"Anita Got Married" – 3:27
"Stuck on Your Love" – 3:30

External links
[ Set List] at Allmusic

2004 greatest hits albums
Duane Steele albums
Royalty Records albums